Basket Swamp is a national park in New South Wales, Australia, 558 km north of Sydney, and 15 kilometres north east of Tenterfield.

The park is named after Basket Swamp, a waterlogged area in the western sector of the park.

This wetland plays an important role in the ecosystem of the Clarence River. Basket Swamp cleans, stores and discharges clean water into the surrounding streams that flow into the river.

References

See also
 Protected areas of New South Wales
High Conservation Value Old Growth forest

National parks of New South Wales
Protected areas established in 1999
1999 establishments in Australia